Archbishop Bagrat Galstanyan - Armenian: Բագրատ արքեպիսկոպոս Գալստանյան (born May 20, 1971), is an Armenian theologian and a cleric of the Armenian Apostolic Church who is currently serving as primate of the Diocese of Tavush. He also served as primate of the Armenian Diocese of Canada based in Montreal.

Early life and church career
Bagrat Galstanian was born in Gyumri, Armenia, on May 20, 1971, and was given the name Vazgen at his baptism. Having attended the Gevorgyan Seminary of Mother See of Holy Etchmiadzin, in Armenia, he received the ordination of deacon, in 1993 from Bishop Anania Arabajyan. In 1995 he received excellent mark for his thesis on “The Commendatory and Theology of Khosrov of Andzrev on Daily Prayers of our Church.” The same year the Catholicos of All Armenians, Karekin I, ordained Vazgen a celibate priest, in the name of Archbishop Bagrat Vardazarian, who had been martyred in 1937 repressions.

In 1995, while holding the position as director of Saint Gregory the Illuminator Sunday school in Holy Etchmiadzin, Bishop Bagrat was appointed as vice-president of the newly established Centre of Christian Education and Preaching. During this period, his responsibilities included the teaching of the Holy Liturgy, Church History and Theology and Armenian Church hymns, in the Gevorgyan and Vazgenyan Seminaries in Armenia.

In 1996 he became editor-in-chief of Etchmiadzin, a monthly official publication of the Mother See of Holy Etchmiadzin. Also, he was involved in the preparation of religious teachers in five regions of Armenia through the Christian Education and Preaching Centre. These included the American University in Yerevan, and in the regions of Etchmiadzin, Armavir, Masis, Artashat, and Aparan. He was one of the founding members of “Gantegh” religious television programming.

From 1996 to 1998 Bishop Bagrat assisted Karekin I as secretary in his pontifical visits to South America, Moscow, U.K., and Austria. In Austria, he participated, as a delegate, in the second Council of European Churches in Graz.

In 2000, upon the completion of his studies in England, Bishop Bagrat returned to Armenia where the Catholicos of all Armenians, Karekin II appointed him as the principal of the Vaskenian Theological Academy (Armenian:Վազգէնեան Դպրանոց), in Sevan. At the seminary, he taught the Theology of Saint Paul, the Theology of Saint John the Evangelist, as well as Church History. Under his leadership, the Lousavorich (Armenian: Լուսաւորիչ) polyphonic choir was formed. Subsequently they produced two CDs:  Arevagal in Geghard and Komitasian Holy Mass. The choir held concerts in Yerevan, and performed to audiences in Etchmiadzin, Sevan, and throughout Armenia. The Vaskenian Seminary also published its first annual theological magazine Sourp Arakelots (Armenian: Սուրբ Առաքելոց).

While at the Seminary, Bishop Bagrat introduced the subject of “Green Theology” for the first time in Eastern European and the former Soviet Republic and its churches. In cooperation with World Council of Church’s office in the Mother See “Round Table,” this subject was brought to the Seminary, and thus introduced to the Armenian Church.

In 2002 he received the rank of Vardapet for his thesis on “The Problem of the Sacrament of anointing the sick in the Armenian Church.” At this time Bagrat was appointed head of the newly founded department of Media, Relations and Communications of Mother See of Holy Etchmiadzin. This position also included directorship of spiritual programming on Shoghakat TV television. Bagrat became the moderator on his own series, “To Know the Gospel” This series consisted of weekly sermons and commentaries on the New Testament, including numerous episodes of debates and discussions on religious topics. Bagrat Galstanian has published numerous articles on theology, social, cultural spheres concerning Armenia, and the Armenian Church.

In 2002, he was appointed Vicar General of the Diocese of Aragatsotn in Armenia. Bagrat founded a children’s dance group and choir in Oshakan, expanded and restructured the Christian Education Center, and established “Youth Computing Centers”. in Ashtarak, Aparan and Talin were re-obtained from the government 17 monasteries and churches with their adjacent lands which historically belonged to the Mother See, but were annexed by the previous Soviet regime. He acquired a day care, youth centre in Talin, under the spiritual guidance of the Diocese of Aragatsotn.

The General Assembly of the Canadian Diocese elected Galstanian as Primate of the Diocese of the Armenian Church of Canada in May 2003. Subsequently, on June 22 of the same year, Karekin II elevated Bagrat to the rank of bishop, in the Cathedral of Mother See of Holy Etchmiadzin, on the feast of Holy Etchmiadzin.

Education
On the recommendation of Karekin I in 1998, he was sent to England to study at the University of Leeds. He attended studies at the College of the Resurrection at Mirfield, at the same time assuming the position of visiting priest of Manchester’s Holy Trinity Armenian Church, until the year 2000. From 1996 to 2000 Bishop Bagrat was an active contributing member of the organizing Executive Committee of the celebrations for the 1700th. Anniversary of the adoption of Christianity in Armenia.

In November 2012 Bagrat Galstanyan completed his post-graduate studies at Concordia University and was awarded a Master of Arts Degree in Theological Studies. His area of study was, Theology and Bioethics, and his chosen thesis, The Health Care System in Armenia: The Historical, Social, and Theological Perspective: Past, Present, and Prospects.

Honors
On January 6, 2013, in Montreal, QC, Galstanian was presented with the Diamond Jubilee Medal of Queen Elizabeth II. Alexandre Boulerice, Member of Parliament for the Rosemont, presented the medal on behalf of Thomas Mulcair, leader of the New Democratic Party of Canada and Member of Parliament for Outremont.

See also
 Diocese of Tavush

References

External links
 Bishop Bagrat Galstanyan's profile on the website of Diocese of the Armenian Church of Canada
 Facebook
 Sermons by Bishop Bagrat Galstanyan
 Bishop Bagrat Galstanyan's Biography on Mother See of Holy Etchmiadzin

Bishops of the Armenian Apostolic Church
Alumni of the University of Leeds
Gevorgian Seminary alumni
Living people
1971 births
20th-century Oriental Orthodox clergy
21st-century Oriental Orthodox bishops
People from Gyumri
Armenian Apostolic Church in Canada